Horncastle was a county constituency in Lincolnshire which returned one Member of Parliament (MP) to the House of Commons of the Parliament of the United Kingdom.  MPs were elected by the first past the post system of voting.

The constituency was created by the Redistribution of Seats Act 1885, and first used for the 1885 general election.  It was abolished for the 1983 general election.

Boundaries
1885–1918: The Sessional Division of Spilsby, and parts of the Sessional Divisions of Alford and Horncastle.

1918–1950: The Urban Districts of Alford, Horncastle, Skegness, and Woodhall Spa, and the Rural Districts of Horncastle, Sibsey, and Spilsby.

1950–1983: The Urban Districts of Alford, Horncastle, Mablethorpe and Sutton, Skegness, and Woodhall Spa, and the Rural Districts of Horncastle and Spilsby.

Members of Parliament

Election results

Elections in the 1880s 

Stanhope was appointed Secretary of State for the Colonies, requiring a by-election.

Elections in the 1890s 

Stanhope's death caused a by-election.

Elections in the 1900s

Elections in the 1910s

Elections in the 1920s

Elections in the 1930s

Elections in the 1940s 
General Election 1939–40

Another General Election was required to take place before the end of 1940. The political parties had been making preparations for an election to take place from 1939 and by the end of this year, the following candidates had been selected; 
Conservative: Henry Haslam
Labour: Frank J Knowles

Elections in the 1950s

Elections in the 1960s

Elections in the 1970s

References

Craig, F. W. S. (1983). British parliamentary election results 1918-1949 (3 ed.). Chichester: Parliamentary Research Services. .

Constituencies of the Parliament of the United Kingdom established in 1885
Constituencies of the Parliament of the United Kingdom disestablished in 1983
Parliamentary constituencies in Lincolnshire (historic)
Horncastle